Coat of arms of the Congo may refer to:

Coat of arms of the Republic of the Congo, a shield with a red lion holding a torch
Coat of arms of the Democratic Republic of the Congo